Margana is a genus of moths of the family Erebidae. The genus was erected by Francis Walker in 1866.

Butterflies and Moths of the World gives this name as a synonym of Egnasia Walker, 1859.

Species
Margana seclusalis Walker, [1866] Java
Margana tenuilinea (Swinhoe, 1905) Sumatra and possibly Borneo

References

Calpinae